Asociación Deportiva Fundación Logroñés was a Spanish football team based in Logroño in the autonomous community of La Rioja. Founded in 1999, it played in 3ª División - Group 16 until 2008–09 season. The club was dissolved in 2009 due to impossibility to find funds for manage the club. Its stadium was Estadio Mundial 82 with a capacity of 3,500 seaters.

Season to season

5 seasons in Tercera División

References

Sport in Logroño
Association football clubs established in 1999
Association football clubs disestablished in 2009
Defunct football clubs in La Rioja (Spain)
1999 establishments in Spain
2009 disestablishments in Spain